Yang Sang-Min  (born February 24, 1984) is a South Korean football player who currently plays for Suwon Samsung Bluewings.

Club career statistics

External links 
 
 National Team Player Record 
 

1984 births
Living people
Association football defenders
South Korean footballers
South Korea international footballers
Jeonnam Dragons players
Suwon Samsung Bluewings players
Ansan Mugunghwa FC players
K League 1 players
K League 2 players
Sportspeople from Incheon